DLBD may refer to:

 Dementia with Lewy bodies, also called diffuse Lewy body disease (DLBD)
 Dictionary of Literary Biography: Documentary series
 Dual-layer Blu-ray Disc
 a command in SCL (System Control Language), of the ICL VME operating system